The Bells of Shoreditch is a novel by the British writer James Kennaway. It set in the morally corrupting world of merchant banking in the City of London.

References

Bibliography
 Trevor Royle. Macmillan Companion to Scottish Literature. Macmillan, 1984.

1963 British novels
Novels by James Kennaway
Novels set in London
Longman books